Taylor Monét Parks (born September 16, 1993), known professionally as Tayla Parx, is an American singer, songwriter, and actress. In 2018, Parks was credited as a co-writer on three Billboard Hot 100 top 10 singles: "Love Lies" by Khalid and Normani, "Thank U, Next" by Ariana Grande, and "High Hopes" by Panic! at the Disco. Her writing contributions on Grande's album Thank U, Next, and Justin Bieber's Justice have earned her two nominations for the Grammy Award for Album of the Year.

Career 
Taylor Monet Parks, was born on 16 September 1993 in Dallas, Texas, was a student at Debbie Allen’s dance academy in the city. After obtaining permission from Parks's parents, Allen took the student to Washington, D.C., where she joined the professional cast at the John F. Kennedy Center for the Performing Arts.

Parks played the role of Little Inez in the 2007 musical movie Hairspray. She has also appeared in the television series Gilmore Girls, Everybody Hates Chris, Carpoolers, Bones, Victorious, and had a recurring role in the Nickelodeon sitcom True Jackson, VP starring Keke Palmer. 
Parks is also a personal friend of Palmer's.

Parks was signed as a songwriter by Jon Platt at Warner Chappell Publishing at age 19. She has contributed to albums by Ariana Grande, Khalid, Jennifer Lopez, BTS, Jason Derulo, Pentatonix, Mariah Carey, The Internet, Camila Cabello, Fifth Harmony, and Chris Brown (featured on the track "Anyway" from his Royalty album). She has written with various artists/producers including Demi Lovato, Kenny "Babyface" Edmonds, LeAnn Rimes, DJ Mustard, Christina Aguilera, Usher, Rihanna, Nicki Minaj, Normani, Tyler Hubbard (of Florida Georgia Line), Meghan Trainor, and Marcus & Martinus. Parks has also written hits for K-pop artists BTS, Red Velvet, f(x) and Tao.

She also does voice acting for one of the voice types that can be given to Sims in The Sims 4, and has appeared as a judge on a Sims-based game show named The Sims Spark'd.

Personal life 
In an interview on the LGBTQ&A podcast, Parks said she identifies as bisexual. Parks became engaged to Shirlene Quigley in January 2021.

Discography

Albums

Mixtapes

Extended plays

Singles

As lead artist

As featured artist

Soundtrack appearances

Songwriting credits

Filmography

Film

Television

Video games

References

External links

1993 births
Living people
21st-century American actresses
Actresses from Texas
African-American actresses
American child actresses
American film actresses
American television actresses
American video game actresses
People from Mesquite, Texas
21st-century African-American women
21st-century African-American people